The 1990–91 Los Angeles Kings season, was the Kings' 24th season in the National Hockey League. It saw the Kings finish first in the Smythe Division with a 46-24-10 record for 102 points. This was the only regular-season division title in Kings history, and the second-best regular-season finish in franchise history. The team defeated the Vancouver Canucks four games to two in the Smythe Division Semi-final before falling to the Edmonton Oilers four games to two in the Division Final.

Offseason

NHL Draft
Los Angeles's draft picks at the 1990 NHL Entry Draft held at the BC Place in Vancouver, British Columbia.

Regular season

Final standings

Schedule and results

Player statistics

Transactions
The Kings were involved in the following transactions during the 1990–91 season.

Trades

Free agent signings

Free agents lost

Waivers

Playoffs

Round 1: (S1) Los Angeles Kings vs. (S4) Vancouver Canucks

Round 2: (S1) Los Angeles Kings vs. (S3) Edmonton Oilers

Awards and records
 Wayne Gretzky, Art Ross Trophy
 Wayne Gretzky, Longest Consecutive Games Assist Streak, 23 games (48 assists during the streak)
 Marty McSorley, NHL Plus-Minus Award
 Dave Taylor, Masterton Trophy Winner
 Tom Webster, runner-up for the Jack Adams Trophy

References
 Kings on Hockey Database

1990-91
1990–91 NHL season by team
1990–91 in American ice hockey by team
1990
LA Kings
LA Kings